The British Journal of Health Psychology is a quarterly peer-reviewed scientific journal covering health psychology. It was established in 1996, when it was split off from the existing British Journal of Clinical Psychology. It is published by Wiley-Blackwell on behalf of the British Psychological Society. The editors-in-chief are Madelynne Arden (Sheffield Hallam University) and Joseph Chilcot (King's College London). According to the Journal Citation Reports, the journal has a 2018 impact factor of 2.472, ranking it 45th out of 130 journals in the category "Psychology, Clinical".

References

External links

Health psychology journals
Wiley-Blackwell academic journals
British Psychological Society academic journals
Publications established in 1996
English-language journals
Quarterly journals